Girls on the Loose is a 1958 American crime film noir directed by Paul Henreid and starring Mara Corday, Lita Milan and Barbara Bostock.

Plot
Vera (Mara Corday) runs a nightclub that's really a front for her secret operation: an all-female crime ring that's been pulling off heist after heist. The gang does a major job with the help of Agnes (Abby Dalton), a new recruit and insider with access to a bank's payroll. But then the nervous Agnes threatens to squeal, so Vera has her rubbed out. And when Vera's good-girl sister, Helen (Barbara Bostock), starts dating suspicious policeman Bill (Mark Richman), Vera gets cutthroat.

Cast
 Mara Corday as Vera Parkinson
 Lita Milan as Marie Williams
 Barbara Bostock as Helen Parkinson
 Peter Mark Richman as Police Lt. Bill Hanley (as Mark Richman)
 Joyce Barker as Joyce Johanneson
 Abby Dalton as Agnes Clark
 Jon Lormer as Doctor
 Ronald Green as Danny
 Fred Kruger as Mr. Grant
 Paul Lambert as Joe
 Monika Henreid as Lilly (as Monica Elizabeth Henreid)

Reception
Writing for Turner Classic Movies, critic Nathaniel Thompson described the film as a "low-budget oddity" that is "a proud member [of] the girl gang genre," but which is "elevated by a strong, provocative lead bad girl in the form of Corday."

References

External links
 
 
 

1958 films
American crime drama films
Film noir
1958 drama films
Universal Pictures films
1950s English-language films
1950s American films